Robert James Schaw (born 12 May 1984) is a former New Zealand cricketer.

A slow left-arm wrist-spin bowler, Schaw was born in Waipukurau, Central Hawke's Bay District's largest town, and played for Central Districts cricket team since his debut in 2006, featuring in the first class, one day and Twenty20 line-ups. In July 2009 he was purchased by Wellington.

Anthony Stuart, Wellington's coach, observed that "Robbie gives us some variation and I think he will thrive on the concentrated training environment we have ... He's bowled well against us in the past, he's a young guy and being a wrist spinner his best years are ahead of him."

Notes

External links
 

New Zealand cricketers
Central Districts cricketers
Wellington cricketers
People from Waipukurau
1984 births
Living people
Sportspeople from the Hawke's Bay Region